The Alaskan hare (Lepus othus), also known as the tundra hare, is a species of mammal in the family Leporidae. They do not dig burrows and are found in the open tundra of western Alaska and the Alaska Peninsula in the United States. They are solitary for most of the year except during mating season, when they produce a single litter of up to eight young. Predators include birds of prey and polar bears, as well as humans (typically for food).

Description
The Alaskan hare is one of the largest species of hares. The Alaskan hare is sometimes referred to as the tundra hare. They are one of two species of hares native to the state of Alaska in the United States, the other being the more common snowshoe hare. It has been reported that they also use their feet for defense against predators. The Alaskan hare's ears are fairly short compared to most. They have evolved shorter ears than most hares in order to conserve heat throughout the winter months. Hare's ears play an important role in thermoregulation, and with the Alaskan hare's ears being small, it prevents heat loss in cold climates. In the summer, Alaskan hares have a brown fur coat with white under parts. In the winter, they have a white fur coat with black-tipped ears. They also shed their gray-brown summer topcoat, becoming all white during the winter.

The Alaskan hare is mostly solitary, and usually only congregate in groups during mating season in April and May. They will normally have one litter per year of between four and eight leverets, with the young born during June and July. The leverets are active shortly after birth, and are born with full coats and open eyes. Hares can also carry Tularemia which is a bacterial disease that can be transmitted to pets and humans. It can cause infectious wounds, swollen lymph nodes, and fever or symptoms that feel as if you have the flu.

Taxonomy
The closest relatives of the Alaskan hare are the Arctic hare, Lepus arcticus, of northern Canada and Greenland, and the mountain hare, Lepus timidus, of northern Eurasia, from which the Alaskan hare is geographically isolated.

Habitat and diet
They do not live in burrows, but instead nest in open sites. They are most commonly found in upland tundra or in rocky or brushy areas which provide camouflage and protection from predators. Their range includes western and southwestern Alaska, including the Alaska Peninsula. They are herbivores, eating a variety of foliage and fruits, with foraging taking place primarily at dawn and dusk. Alaskan hares also feed on green plants in the summer, and bark and twigs in the winter. Predators include foxes, polar bears, wolverines, weasels, and birds of prey. They are taken opportunistically by humans for food or for their fur. Their fur can be and is used to line shoes and robes in Alaska.

References

Lepus
Hare, Alaskan
Endemic fauna of the United States
Endemic fauna of Alaska
Mammals of the United States
Hare, Alaskan
Mammals described in 1900 
Taxonomy articles created by Polbot